Anthony Nossiter (born 1973) is an Australian sailor and Olympic medalist. He competed at the 2000, 2004 and 2008 Summer Olympics. His best Olympic result is a sixth place in the Finn class in Athens in 2004. He was an Australian Institute of Sport scholarship holder.

He sailed with +39 Challenge in the 2007 Louis Vuitton Cup and has twice competed in the Volvo Ocean Race; in 2001–02 on Djuice Dragons and in 2011–12 on Azzam.

References

1973 births
Living people
Australian male sailors (sport)
Olympic sailors of Australia
Sailors at the 2000 Summer Olympics – Finn
Sailors at the 2004 Summer Olympics – Finn
Sailors at the 2008 Summer Olympics – Finn
Australian Institute of Sport sailors
2007 America's Cup sailors
Volvo Ocean Race sailors
Green Comm Racing sailors
21st-century Australian people